Leptoderma affinis, the eel slickhead, is a species of slickheads found in the Indian Ocean.  

References

Alepocephalidae
Taxa named by Alfred William Alcock
Fish described in 1899
Marine fish genera